Hiroo (written: 浩生, 浩郎, 広生, 宏央, 博大, 博夫, 博雄) is a masculine Japanese given name.

People with the name
Notable people with the name include:

, Japanese baseball player and politician
, Japanese seismologist
, Japanese golfer
, Japanese sumo wrestler
, Japanese sumo wrestler
, Governor of Hiroshima Prefecture
, Imperial Japanese Army intelligence officer
, Japanese ski jumper
, Japanese businessman
, Japanese writer

See also
Hiro (given name)

Japanese masculine given names